Banmankhi Bazar is a town and a notified area in Purnia district  in the state of Bihar, India.

Geography
Banmankhi is situated 32 km away from Purnea, the district town.

Banmankhi is a Sub-division.

Demographics
 India census, Banmankhi Bazar had a population of 25,183. Males constitute 55% of the population and females 45%. Banmankhi Bazar has an average literacy rate of 52%, lower than the national average of 59.5%; with 64% of the males and 36% of females literate. 18% of the population is under 6 years of age.

Economy
Banmankhi Bazar is well known for a sugar manufacturing facility, but it is currently not functioning and is closed. The facility provided employment to many persons.

Education
Private:Jeevan Jyoti resi. High school
Saraswati Shishu Mandir
Sant Paul's Mission School for primary and middle schooling,
Tender Heart Public School. 
Public: 
Sumrit High school: 6-10+2(co-ed) 
MatuRam Kanya Uccha Vidyalaya: 6-10 (female), 
G. L. M. College: Higher Education (co-ed),
J.C. Science College

Transportation

Road
Banmankhi is connected with Purnia, Madhepura, Saharsa and Dhamdaha (Subdivision of Purnia District) through highway.

Railway
Banmankhi Junction is a railway station of Banmankhi. It lies between Barauni-Katihar, Saharsa and Purnia sections of East Central Railway.

References

Cities and towns in Purnia district